Maria Kirkova (born 2 January 1986) is a Bulgarian female skier. She was the flagbearer for Bulgaria and a competitor during the 2014 Winter Olympics and took part in the Alpine skiing events at all four Winter Olympics between 2006 and 2018 as well as the FIS Alpine World Ski Championships in 2003 and six championship from 2007 to 2017.

Olympic Games

Kirkova made her Olympic debut in Slalom during the 2006 Winter Olympics in Turin, but did not finish the course. She then competed in the women's downhill, super-G, slalom and giant slalom in the 2010 Winter Olympics, in all of these she failed to finish, except for the downhill, in which she came 33rd. During the 2014 Winter Olympics, she competed in slalom and giant slalom. She finished 36th in the giant slalom. At the 2018 Winter Olympics she finished 35th in the slalom and 40th in the giant slalom. She also participated at seven world championships between 2003 and 2017.

Results

Winter Olympics 
 2006 Winter Olympics:
 Slalom – DNF

2010 Winter Olympics:
Downhill–33
Super-G–DNF
Slalom–DNF
Giant slalom–DNF

2014 Winter Olympics:
Slalom–DNF
Giant slalom–36

 2018 Winter Olympics
 Giant slalom – 40
 Slalom – 35

World Championships 
FIS Alpine World Ski Championships 2007:
Giant slalom – 44
Slalom – 45
Super-G – 28
Super combined – 22

References

External links
 

 Maria Kirkova at Vancouver2010.com
 Maria Kirkova at Sochi2014.com

1986 births
Bulgarian female alpine skiers
Alpine skiers at the 2006 Winter Olympics
Alpine skiers at the 2010 Winter Olympics
Alpine skiers at the 2014 Winter Olympics
Alpine skiers at the 2018 Winter Olympics
Olympic alpine skiers of Bulgaria
Living people